Middlewood Higher railway station was a railway station located near to the village of High Lane in Cheshire, England (now in Greater Manchester). It was opened in 1879 by the Macclesfield, Bollington and Marple Railway (MB&M) – a joint line constructed and operated by the Manchester, Sheffield and Lincolnshire Railway (MS&L) and North Staffordshire Railways (NSR).

Without the interchange, people wishing to travel between Macclesfield and Buxton had to travel to Stockport to change trains and then travel back on themselves to get to Buxton. The board of the MB&M proposed to the LNWR that both companies should open a station where the two lines crossed at Middlewood, to allow passengers to save a considerable distance and time in their travel; the LNWR agreed and both the MB&M station, known simply as Middlewood, and the LNWR's Middlewood for Norbury station opened on 2 June 1879. They were connected by a flight of steps.

While this allowed for passenger interchange, the layout did not allow for goods interchange and, in 1882, discussion started on connecting the two lines by a rail link.  The NSR and the LNWR agreed terms, but the MS&L could not agree running powers with the LNWR, so the NSR and LNWR agreed to proceed on their own.  The resulting section of line known as the Middlewood curve opened on 20 May 1885.  Most train services on the MB&M were run using MS&L engines and rolling stock but, because of the running power agreement, services between Macclesfield and Buxton were provided by the NSR.

The station buildings, including the platforms, were all of timber construction and was built on an embankment.  This made it susceptible to subsidence and landslips. In 1955, part of the down (towards Manchester) platform and the waiting shelter were lost when the embankment collapsed.  As the usage of the station was not high, replacing the lost section was considered uneconomic and reconstruction was not carried out; however, there are some remains of the support pillars for both sides of the station.

As the station served a sparsely populated area, and there were two other stations ( and ) close by, the number of people using the Middlewood Higher (as it had been renamed in 1951) was not high and, in 1960, after consultation, the station closed.

When all of the MB&M closed in 1970, the track was lifted, although the bridge across the Buxton line remains. The trackbed now forms part of the Middlewood Way, a recreational path between Macclesfield and Marple.

References
Notes

Sources

Railway stations in Great Britain opened in 1879
Railway stations in Great Britain closed in 1960
Disused railway stations in Cheshire
Former Macclesfield Committee stations